

Werner Lange (18 July 1893 – 19 November 1965) was a Vizeadmiral with the Kriegsmarine during World War II and recipient of the  Knight's Cross of the Iron Cross.

Awards
 Iron Cross (1914) 2nd Class (15 May 1916) & 1st Class (1 February 1918)
 U-boat War Badge (1918) (14 December 1918)
 Hanseatic Cross of Hamburg (20 April 1918)
 The Honour Cross of the World War 1914/1918 (2 March 1935)
 Clasp to the Iron Cross (1939) 2nd Class (16 October 1939) & 1st Class (27 May 1940)
 German Cross in Gold on 8 January 1944 as Vizeadmiral and commanding admiral of the Aegean Sea
 Knight's Cross of the Iron Cross on 28 October 1944 as Vizeadmiral and commanding admiral of the Aegean Sea

References

Citations

Bibliography

 
 
 

1893 births
1965 deaths
People from Altenburg
Vice admirals of the Kriegsmarine
Recipients of the clasp to the Iron Cross, 1st class
Recipients of the Gold German Cross
Recipients of the Knight's Cross of the Iron Cross
Imperial German Navy personnel of World War I
Reichsmarine personnel
People from Saxe-Altenburg
Sportspeople from Thuringia
Military personnel from Thuringia